Onslow Road may refer to:
Onslow Road in Burwood Park, Surrey, United Kingdom
Onslow Road (Western Australia)